Ab-e Garm-e Givy (also Romanized as Āb-e Garm-e Gīvy; also known as Āb-e Garm) is a village in Sanjabad-e Gharbi Rural District, in the Central District of Kowsar County, Ardabil Province, Iran. At the 2006 census, its population was 47, in 13 families.

References 

Towns and villages in Kowsar County